Kashmir Pending is a graphic novel written by Srinagar-based Naseer Ahmed, and published by Phantomville. It tells the story of several characters in Kashmir and deals with strife in the region. The book met with positive reviews, praising the handling of the subject, characterisations, and art.

See also 
 Indian comics

External links 
 Deccan Herald Review
 Indian Express Review
 Editorial on Kashmir Pending

Indian graphic novels
Kashmir conflict in fiction
Comics set in India
2007 Indian novels
2011 graphic novels